The Mary Rose was a galleon of the English Tudor navy, built in 1555–1556. She was rebuilt during 1589. Her complement was 250 comprising 150 mariners, 30 gunners and 70 soldiers. 

She was condemned in 1618 and expended as part of a wharf at Chatham Dockyard.

Notes

Citations

References

Winfield, Rif (2009) British Warships in the Age of Sail 1603-1714: Design, Construction, Careers and Fates. Seaforth Publishing. .

Ships of the English navy
16th-century ships